Yasin Öztop (born 25 May 1991) is a Turkish footballer who plays for Çankaya FK. He made his Süper Lig debut on 28 October 2012.

References

External links

1991 births
Living people
People from Aybastı
Turkish footballers
Orduspor footballers
Süper Lig players
Association football defenders